Alice Bacon may refer to:

 Alice Bacon, Baroness Bacon (1909–1993), British politician
 Alice Mabel Bacon (1858–1918), American author